This is a list of New York Rangers award winners.

League awards

Team trophies

Individual awards

All-Stars

NHL first and second team All-Stars
The NHL first and second team All-Stars are the top players at each position as voted on by the Professional Hockey Writers' Association.

NHL All-Rookie Team
The NHL All-Rookie Team consists of the top rookies at each position as voted on by the Professional Hockey Writers' Association.

All-Star Game selections
The National Hockey League All-Star Game is a mid-season exhibition game held annually between many of the top players of each season. Sixty-four All-Star Games have been held since 1947, with at least one player chosen to represent the Rangers in each year. The All-Star Game has not been held in various years: 1979 and 1987 due to the 1979 Challenge Cup and Rendez-vous '87 series between the NHL and the Soviet national team, respectively; 1995, 2005 and 2013 as a result of labor stoppages; 2006, 2010 and 2014 due to the Winter Olympic Games; and 2021 as a result of the COVID-19 pandemic. The Rangers have hosted two of the games. The 26th and 45th took place at Madison Square Garden.

 Selected by fan vote
 Selected as one of four "last men in" by fan vote
 All-Star Game Most Valuable Player

All-Star benefit games
Prior to the institution of the National Hockey League All-Star Game the league held three different benefit games featuring teams of all-stars.  The first was the Ace Bailey Benefit Game, held in 1934, after a violent collision with Eddie Shore of the Boston Bruins left Ace Bailey of the Toronto Maple Leafs hospitalized and unable to continue his playing career. In 1937 the Howie Morenz Memorial Game was held to raise money for the family of Howie Morenz of the Montreal Canadiens who died from complications after being admitted to the hospital for a broken leg. The Babe Siebert Memorial Game was held in 1939 to raise funds for the family of the Canadiens' Babe Siebert who drowned shortly after he retired from playing.

All-Star Game replacement events

Career achievements

Hockey Hall of Fame
The following is a list of New York Rangers who have been enshrined in the Hockey Hall of Fame.

Foster Hewitt Memorial Award
Three members of the Rangers organization have been honored with the Foster Hewitt Memorial Award. The award is presented by the Hockey Hall of Fame to members of the radio and television industry who make outstanding contributions to their profession and the game of ice hockey during their broadcasting career.

Lester Patrick Trophy
The Lester Patrick Trophy has been presented by the National Hockey League and USA Hockey since 1966 to honor a recipient's contribution to ice hockey in the United States. This list includes all personnel who have ever been employed by the New York Rangers in any capacity and have also received the Lester Patrick Trophy.

United States Hockey Hall of Fame

Retired numbers

The New York Rangers have retired nine of their jersey numbers. Also out of circulation is the number 99 which was retired league-wide for Wayne Gretzky on February 6, 2000. Gretzky played the final three seasons of his 20-year NHL career with the Rangers and was the only Rangers player who ever wore the number 99 prior to its retirement.

Team awards

John Halligan Good Guy Award
The John Halligan Good Guy Award is an annual award which "recognizes a player for their cooperation with the media throughout the season." It was renamed for longtime Rangers public relations director John Halligan after Halligan's death on January 20, 2010.

Lars-Erik Sjoberg Award
The Lars-Erik Sjoberg Award is an annual award given to the top rookie during training camp. The award is named for Lars-Erik Sjoberg, who was the Rangers chief European scout for eight years who died at the age of 43 on October 20, 1987.

Players' Player Award
The Players' Player Award is an annual award given to the player "who best exemplifies what it means to be a team player" as determined by his teammates.

Rangers MVP
The Rangers MVP award is an annual award given to the team's most valuable player as determined by the Professional Hockey Writers' Association.

Steven McDonald Extra Effort Award
The Steven McDonald Extra Effort Award is an annual award which is given to the player who "goes above and beyond the call of duty" as determined by the fans. The award is named for New York City police officer Steven McDonald, who was shot and injured on July 12, 1986.

Defunct team awards

Ceil Saidel Memorial Award
The Ceil Saidel Memorial Award was an annual award which recognized a player "for their dedication to the organization on and off the ice" as chosen by the Rangers Fan Club. The award was named in honor of Ceil Saidel, who was a member of the Rangers Fan Club since its inception in 1951 and died in 1994 during an attempted robbery. It has not been awarded since the New York Rangers Fan Club suspended operations in 2010.

"Crumb Bum" Award
The "Crumb Bum" Award is given to a member of the Rangers organization in recognition for service to New York youngsters. It was last awarded in 2004.

Frank Boucher Trophy
The Frank Boucher Trophy was an annual award given to the Ranger "who is considered the most popular player on and off the ice" as chosen by the Rangers Fan Club. It was named for Rangers great Frank Boucher. It has not been awarded since the New York Rangers Fan Club suspended operations in 2010.

Rookie of the Year
The Rookie of the Year award was an annual award given to the Rangers top rookie as determined by the Rangers Fan Club. It was not awarded from 1994–95 through 1998–99. It has not been awarded since the New York Rangers Fan Club suspended operations in 2010.

Other awards

See also
List of National Hockey League awards

Notes

References

New York Rangers
awards
History of the New York Rangers